Liss Riverside Railway Walk North is a   Local Nature Reserve which runs north from Liss in Hampshire. It is owned and managed by East Hampshire District Council.

This footpath follows part of  the route of the former Longmoor Military Railway from Liss to Liss Forest. The path goes through willow and alder woodland.

References

Local Nature Reserves in Hampshire